In mathematics, a deformation ring is a ring that controls liftings of a representation of a Galois group from a finite field to a local field. In particular for any such lifting problem there is often a universal deformation ring that classifies all such liftings, and whose spectrum is the universal deformation space.

A key step in Wiles's proof of the modularity theorem was to study the relation between universal deformation rings and Hecke algebras.

See also
Deformation (mathematics)
Galois module

References

Number theory